Olympiastadion, Helsinki, July 31, 2012 is a live album by Bruce Springsteen and the E Street Band, released on May 23, 2017. It is the thirteenth such release by the Bruce Springsteen Archives. The concert is notable for being, as of the time of its release, the longest by Springsteen and the band, at four hours and six minutes in length. The show also included a brief five-song acoustic set for fans who had arrived early; this is not included on the recording. The concert is the third full-length show from the Wrecking Ball Tour to be released, following Apollo Theater 3/09/12, a rehearsal for the tour, and Ippodromo delle Capannelle, Rome 2013.

Track listing
All songs by Bruce Springsteen, except where noted.

Main set

"Rockin' All Over the World" – 4:43
written and originally recorded by John Fogerty 
"Night" – 3:19
"Out in the Street" – 6:26
"Loose Ends" – 4:35
"Prove It All Night" – 8:35
features the long 1978 introduction
"We Take Care of Our Own" – 4:32
"Wrecking Ball" – 7:09
"Death to My Hometown" – 4:51  
"My City of Ruins" – 18:26
"Does This Bus Stop at 82nd Street?" – 6:22
"Be True" – 4:34
"Jack of All Trades" – 6:46
"Downbound Train" – 5:07
"Because the Night" – 6:00
"Lonesome Day" – 4:33
"Darlington County" – 7:48
"Light of Day – Land of a Thousand Dances" – 8:20
"Land of a Thousand Dances" written and originally recorded by Chris Kenner
"Shackled and Drawn" – 8:53
"Waitin' on a Sunny Day" – 10:37
"Back in Your Arms" – 11:39
"The Rising" – 5:11
"Badlands" – 6:27
"Land of Hope and Dreams" – 14:16

Encore

"We Are Alive" – 6:49
"Born in the U.S.A." – 5:20
"Born to Run" – 6:22
"Detroit Medley" – 6:10
Written by Mitch Ryder and recorded by Mitch Ryder and the Detroit Wheels
"Glory Days" – 5:36
"Dancing in the Dark" – 9:39
"Tenth Avenue Freeze-Out" – 11:35 
"I Don't Want to Go Home" – 5:27
written by Steven Van Zandt and recorded by Southside Johnny and the Asbury Jukes
"(Your Love Keeps Lifting Me) Higher and Higher – 7:44
originally written by Gary Jackson and Carl Smith, and recorded by Jackie Wilson
"Twist and Shout" – 12:25
written by Phil Medley and Bert Berns and originally recorded by The Top Notes

The pre-show set included "I'll Work For Your Love", "Leap of Faith", "No Surrender", "For You", and "Blinded by the Light".

Personnel 
The E Street Band
Bruce Springsteen – lead vocals, electric guitar, acoustic guitar, harmonica
Roy Bittan – piano, electric keyboard, accordion
Nils Lofgren – electric guitar, acoustic guitar, pedal steel guitar,  background vocals
Garry Tallent – bass guitar
Steven Van Zandt – electric guitar, mandolin, background vocals
Max Weinberg – drums

and
Charlie Giordano – organ, electric keyboards
Jake Clemons – saxophone, percussion, background vocals
Soozie Tyrell – violin, acoustic guitar, background vocals

with
Everett Bradley – percussion, background vocals
Curtis King – percussion, background vocals
Cindy Mizelle – background vocals
Michelle Moore – background vocals
Barry Danelian – trumpet
Clark Gayton – trombone
Eddie Manion – saxophone
Curt Ramm – trumpet
Jon Landau – guitar on "(Your Love Keeps Lifting Me) Higher and Higher" and "Twist and Shout"

References

2017 live albums
Bruce Springsteen Archives